Marble Blast Gold is a 2002 3D platform game. It was pre-installed on some Apple Inc. computers like the iMac, iBook, and Mac mini. It is also available for Windows operating systems as well as various Linux distributions.

The game was originally released in December 2002 as Marble Blast and then updated in May 2003, being renamed Marble Blast Gold. At some point during 2003, it was also licensed to eGames to be resold under the name Marble Blaster.

The sequel, Marble Blast Ultra, was released a few years later for the Xbox 360 platform with new features and improved graphics. A spiritual successor to Gold and Ultra, Marble It Up, was released for the Nintendo Switch in September 2018, later being ported to Windows and Apple Arcade later that year. Marble Blast XP, a version for the Net Jet online game system, has updated graphics and a marble selector. Marble Blast Gold was also ported over to the Microsoft Xbox through the Xbox Live Arcade service the following year with enhanced graphics.

Modifications of the game have also been created by the Marble Blast community, most notably Marble Blast Platinum, PlatinumQuest, Marble Blast Powered Up, and Marble Blast Emerald.

Gameplay
Basic gameplay involves taking the perspective of an autonomous marble moving on its own from a start pad to an end pad, without falling out of bounds. Levels may contain hazards to make this more difficult. The player controls the marble spin, and therefore movement, and can also make the marble jump. There is a variety of power-ups available to the player, which are collected by touching them with the marble. Some levels must be completed within a Qualification time, to increase difficulty.  Each level also has a "Gold Time", an additional challenge to complete the level in a specified time-frame.  Each gold time is always possible but usually involves finding hidden powerups and/or taking shortcuts.  Some levels require a number of gems to be picked up before the level can be finished. There are 100 levels, categorized by difficulty: 24 Beginner, 24 Intermediate, and 52 Advanced.

Reception
Marble Blast Gold received critical acclaim from critics upon release.

On GameRankings, Marble Blast Gold received an 8.4/10 rating, "Addictive gameplay and sweet levels lead to some of the best fun that $14.99 can buy". On Gametunnel, the game was rated 9/10 overall, "Marble Blast Gold is another great entry into the marble genre and a showpiece for the Torque engine. Highly recommended!" On GamersInfo, the reviewer noted: "The game can be a lot of fun, especially if you are the type that likes to challenge your hand–eye coordination."

See also
Super Monkey Ball

References

2002 video games
EGames (video game developer) games
Linux games
MacOS games
Marble games
Original Xbox Live Arcade games
Puzzle video games
Single-player video games
Torque (game engine) games
Video games developed in the United States
Windows games
Xbox games